Superbe, a French word meaning "superb", may refer to:

 Superbe (river), in Haute-Saône, France
 French ship Superbe, several ships

See also
 Superb (disambiguation)